Oeum or Oion was a mountain fortress and town situated in eastern Locris, above Opus, and destroyed by an earthquake.

Oeum has tentatively been located south of the modern Kastri Atalantis.

References

Populated places in Opuntian Locris
Former populated places in Greece